Charles Perry (17 February 1807 – 2 December 1891) was an English Australian, who served as the first Anglican Bishop of Melbourne, Australia and was a university administrator.

Early life
Perry was born in Hackney, Middlesex, the third son of John Perry, sheriff of Essex and shipbuilder, and his second wife, Mary, daughter of George Green. The Perrys and the Greens were deeply involved with Blackwall_Yard, one of the largest private shipyards in the world. George Green was a noted philanthropist, underwriting the architecturally significant Trinity Independent Chapel and its associated "minister's house, sailors' home, schools, and almshouses" and has a school named after him. 

Charles was educated at private schools at Clapham Common and Hackney, then for four years at Harrow, where he played in the school cricket eleven. Perry was a contemporary of Charles Wordsworth, nephew of the poet, and Henry Edward Manning; all three young men became bishops, albeit in different churches. At Harrow, due to some youthful folly, the headmaster asked Perry's mother to remove him and send him to private tutors. In 1824 he went to Trinity College, Cambridge, where he graduated B.A. (1828) as senior wrangler, first Smith's prizeman and 7th in the first class of the classical tripos. Christopher Wordsworth, father of his friend, was Master of Trinity from 1820 to 1841. Perry was elected a fellow of Trinity College in 1829, was awarded and M.A. in 1831 and began reading for the bar, but his health broke down, and in 1832 he returned to Trinity College as assistant-tutor and later tutor.

Clerical career and to Australia
While at Cambridge Perry was ordained deacon on 16 June 1833 and a priest on 26 November 1836 by the bishop of Ely. On 14 October 1841, Perry married Frances (Fanny) Cooper who he met while a curate at Newtown, Cambridge. Perry purchased the Advowson of the living of Barnwell, vested the patronage in trustees and secured the erection of two churches. Of one of these, St Paul's, Perry became the first vicar in 1842.

Five years later Perry was appointed the first Bishop of Melbourne and he and Fanny sailed on the Stag on 6 October 1847 and arrived in Port Phillip District (later named Victoria) on 23 January 1848. Perry discovered that there was one over-burdened cleric in Melbourne and one each in Geelong and Portland. Perry had brought three clergy with him and there were three lay readers, thus making with the bishop a total of nine persons to minister to a district as large as Great Britain. Bishop Broughton of Sydney had given up £500 a year towards the stipend of the new bishop, but there were no diocesan funds and the whole organisation of the diocese had to be worked out and built up. The government offered the Perrys two acres (0.8 hectare) of land for a site for a house a little more than a mile from the post office, or alternatively five acres farther out, and set aside £2000 for the building of a house. Perry decided it would be better to be within easy walking distance of the city. The house, however, was not completed until 1853.

In July 1851 Victoria was constituted a separate colony distinct from New South Wales, and a few weeks later the discovery of gold leading to the Victorian gold rush resulted an enormous influx of population. Perry had succeeded in obtaining about £10,000 for the organization of his diocese from societies and friends in England, however there was little prospect of receiving substantial amounts in the future. Several new churches and schools had been built, and the number of clergy had more than trebled. It was, however, difficult to obtain additional clergy, and the cost of building for a time was exceedingly high during the gold rush era. Perry visited the goldfields and in the meanwhile made what arrangements he could. Another problem was the framing of a constitution for the Church of England in Victoria. In this he had the valuable assistance of Sir William Foster Stawell. A bill was prepared and brought before the Victorian Legislative Council and eventually passed. But there had been some determined opposition to it, and it was known that a petition had been sent to England praying that the royal assent should not be given. Perry was therefore sent to London in 1855 to be able to answer any objections that might be made, and though difficulties were encountered, the assent was eventually given, and Perry returned to Melbourne in April 1856. 

Whilst in England Perry chose a headmaster for the Melbourne Church of England Grammar School, John Edward Bromby. On 30 July 1856 the foundation stone of the school building was laid, and less than a year later the new buildings for the Geelong Church of England Grammar School, established in 1855, was also begun. In 1863 Perry again visited England principally to arrange for clergy to come to his diocese, but it was strongly felt that it would be necessary to provide better for the training of their own clergy in Victoria. On 10 January 1870 Perry laid the foundation stone of Trinity College at the University of Melbourne, but it was not until Alexander Leeper was appointed warden in 1876 that the college made a fair start. Since then several Australian bishops and many clergy have been among its old students.

Return to England
It was decided in 1872 that the diocese should be divided and a bishop appointed at Ballarat; in February 1874 Perry went to England to find a suitable man for this position. The Revd Samuel Thornton was selected and consecrated in May 1875 and Perry abandoned his intention of returning to Melbourne, resigning early in 1876. Perry assisted in finding a successor, who was James Moorhouse. In 1878 Perry was made a canon of Llandaff Cathedral, and in the same year Prelate of the Order of St Michael and St George. In his last years he did much committee work in connexion with missionary societies and was one of the founders of Wycliffe Hall, Oxford, and Ridley Hall, Cambridge. Perry died on 2 December 1891 and was buried at Harlow, Essex. His wife Fanny survived him and they had no children. He published in 1856 Five Sermons preached before the University of Cambridge in November 1855, and in 1864, Foundation Truths: Four Sermons. Various addresses and sermons were also published separately.

Legacy
Perry was a fine scholar and a good administrator who showed wisdom in the conduct and building up of his diocese. When he left it, the number of his clergy had grown to 90. He was an extreme Evangelical and his fear that his church might be Romanized became over-important to him. He made no claim to being a theologian, but was "content to believe in the bible". Perry's portrait by Henry Weigall is at the National Gallery of Victoria, Melbourne.

References

External links
 Photographic portrait of Bishop Charles Perry at State Library Victoria.

1807 births
1891 deaths
People from Hackney Central
Anglican bishops of Melbourne
19th-century Anglican bishops in Australia
Sermon writers
Senior Wranglers
Settlers of Melbourne
Melbourne Grammar School
English emigrants to colonial Australia